Pike is an unincorporated community in Ritchie County, West Virginia, United States.

The community was named for a turnpike intersection near the original town site.

References 

Unincorporated communities in West Virginia
Unincorporated communities in Ritchie County, West Virginia